Henry Omer Benn (January 25, 1890 – June 4, 1967), was a Major League Baseball player who played in one game for the Cleveland Naps in 1914. He was born in Viola, Wisconsin and died in Madison, Wisconsin.

References 

1890 births
1967 deaths
Cleveland Naps players
Baseball players from Wisconsin
Sportspeople from Madison, Wisconsin
Manistee Colts players
Manistee Champs players
Toledo Mud Hens players
Cleveland Bearcats players
New Orleans Pelicans (baseball) players
Cleveland Spiders (minor league) players